Josef Span (born 1 March 1962) is an Austrian weightlifter. He competed in the men's middle heavyweight event at the 1984 Summer Olympics, achieving ninth place.

References

External links
 

1962 births
Living people
Austrian male weightlifters
Olympic weightlifters of Austria
Weightlifters at the 1984 Summer Olympics
Place of birth missing (living people)
20th-century Austrian people